Besins Healthcare is a privately held, fifth-generation family-owned multinational pharmaceutical company headquartered in Monaco.  Founded in 1885 in Paris, Besins Healthcare focuses on transdermal delivery technology treatments and has products available in 100 countries.

The company specializes in Women’s and Men’s Health and is manufacturing and developing drugs for the treatment of gynecological, fertility, and obstetrical conditions as well as androgen deficiencies. Besins Healthcare has three subsidiaries: BHR Pharma, LLC, Ascend Therapeutics and Pure Matters.

Ascend Therapeutics is involved in the research and development of transdermal drugs that are applied to the skin as a gel to treat chronic conditions such as severe breast pain for pre-menopausal women, and low testosterone levels for older men.

Besins Healthcare global research and development is conducted out of BHR Pharma, and LLC. BHR Pharma is in the last stage of human testing of a potential progesterone-based treatment (BHR-100) for severe traumatic brain injury (TBI). The Food and Drug Administration has promised to fast-track the approval process for BHR-100 if the findings are positive. The drug is one of four compounds in late-stage development to combat TBI, and is the only one expected to reach the market before 2019.

Controversy

AG Rosenblum Sues Pharmaceutical Giants AbbVie and Besins 
In November 2022, Oregon Attorney General Ellen Rosenblum sued AbbVie, Abbott Laboratories, Unimed Pharmaceuticals. The lawsuit alleges that the four pharmaceutical companies, which held the exclusive patent for brand-name AndroGel, filed baseless lawsuits to monopolize the market and prevent competitors from entering, which resulted in sky high prices.

Federal Trade Commission v. AbbVie 
The FTC filed a complaint in federal district court in September 2014 charging that AbbVie Inc. and its partner Besins Healthcare Inc. illegally blocked American consumers’ access to lower-cost alternatives to Androgel by filing baseless patent infringement lawsuits against potential generic competitors. In a June 2018 decision, the U.S. District Court for the Eastern District of Pennsylvania ruled that sham litigation was used to create a monopoly.

References

Pharmaceutical companies established in 1885
Pharmaceutical companies of France
Manufacturing companies of Monaco